The University of Notre Dame School of Architecture was the first Catholic university in America to offer a degree in architecture, beginning in 1898. The School offers undergraduate and post-graduate architecture programs.

The School of Architecture has approximately 200 undergraduate students and 30 graduate students. The School has a library, which includes a rare book collection dedicated to the history of the study and practice of architecture in the United States. The School of Architecture is the smallest of the six major program divisions of the University (the others being the Mendoza College of Business, the College of Arts and Letters, the College of Engineering, the College of Science, and the Law School).

The School of Architecture is located in Walsh Family Hall on the Notre Dame campus. It holds the architecture library, a hall of casts, offices, studios, classrooms, and a gallery.

The School teaches (pre-modernist) traditional architecture and urban planning (e.g. following the principles of New Urbanism and New Classical Architecture). It awards the annual Richard H. Driehaus Prize at Notre Dame School of Architecture for achievements in classical and traditional architecture and sustainable urbanism.

History
The University of Notre Dame, founded in 1842 by Edward Sorin, is an independent, national Catholic university located in Notre Dame, Indiana. Architecture as a discipline was taught at the University as early as 1869, but it was not until 1898 that an architecture degree was offered. The first architecture graduate was Cuban Eugenio Rayneri Piedra who earned his degree in 1904. From 1931 to 1963, the Law School was houses in what is today Crowley Hall on Main Quad. The building was constructed in 1893 and hosted the Institute of Technology until it was damaged by fire in 1916; after a restoration it housed the Notre Dame Law School until 1931 before hosting the Architecture Department.

When the new Hesburgh Library was opened in 1963, the old Lemmonier Library (now Bond Hall) was given to the Department of Architecture. The head of the department, Frank Montana, designed plans to renovate the interiors to fit the new needs of the Architecture school. The original limestone exterior with Ionic detailing on the east side was preserved and restored. A  addition was also added to the west elevation. The main challenge during the renovation was the removal of the library stacks, which had a structural function in the building.

The interior was reconfigured to serve its new functions as an architecture building and to correspond with its original classical character. The main lobby became an exhibit hall, flanked on the north by the Architecture Library and on the south by a new lecture hall. The basement contained a darkroom and classrooms, and the mezzanine and second floor were converted into classroom space. The renovation itself was a learning experience for the architectural students themselves.

Upon competition of the renovation, the new Architecture Hall hosted its first classes on 9 November 1964, while finishing touches were still being added. The formal dedication occurred on 1 May 1965, presided by Rev. Theodore Hesburgh, the University president, and Pietro Belluschi, dean of the School of Architecture at the Massachusetts Institute of Technology.

In 1982, the architecture department became the School of Architecture and in 1994 it became a free-standing entity independent from the College of Engineering.

The building was further renovated in 1995, during which the building was closed for 18 months. The $12 million renovation was made possible by a $5 million gift from William W. Bond Jr. ('50) and his wife Joanne. The School of Architecture moved temporarily to the Hayes-Healy Center and Hurley Hall, which had been vacated by the School of Business for its move to the newly constructed business building on DeBartolo Quad. The renovation also included an American Renaissance-style  addition on the west side, designed by Ellerbe Becket under the guidance of architecture chairman Thomas Gordon Smith. The building was rededicated as Bond Hall of Architecture on Friday, 21 March 1997, presided by Rev. Edward Malloy, with speakers including internationally renowned architects Allan Greenberg, Elizabeth Plater-Zyberk, and Demetri Porphyrios, who received honorary degrees from the School of Architecture.

In 2016 construction began on a new building to house the School called The Matthew and Joyce Walsh Family Hall. The building was dedicated on November 9, 2018 and the School of Architecture moved into its new location in the following months.

Academics

Admissions
The University of Notre Dame School of Architecture is accredited by the National Architectural Accrediting Board.  Any undergraduate student admitted as an undergraduate to the University of Notre Dame may declare an architecture major.

Rome Studies Program
The Rome Studies Program was founded in 1969 as a required third-year study abroad program by Francesco "Frank" Montana, Department Chair from 1950 to 1972.

The program consists of four courses per semester including design studio, hand drawing and watercolor, architectural theory, and architectural history. The curriculum focuses on classical architecture and the design of contemporary buildings in a classical manner following the precedents of Vitruvius, Palladio and Vignola. These trips involve visits to historic sites with presentations by faculty members, time for sketching, and free time to explore the cities. Students analyze the country's historical models of buildings and cities to use as resources in creating architecture in the 21st century.

Concentrations
The School of Architecture offers three concentrations: Furniture Design, Preservation and Restoration, and Architectural Practice and Enterprise. Each concentration includes four to five classes across the fourth and fifth year of study.

Facilities

Until 2019 it was housed in Bond Hall, a building on the Notre Dame campus formerly known as the Lemonnier Library. The building served as the principal library of the entire campus from its construction in 1917 until Hesburgh Memorial Library was constructed in 1964. The building was renovated and expanded to become Bond Hall between 1995 and 1997 under the guidance of Thomas Gordon Smith, the Department Chair from 1989 to 1998 and current faculty member. Bond Hall contained studio space for both undergraduate and students, several classrooms, and an auditorium that seats approximately 100 people. Bond Hall was then repurposed to house a student-learning center on campus together with Coleman Morse Hall, the Notre Dame Graduate School, the Institute for Latino Studies and the Flatley Center for Undergraduate Scholarly Engagement will move into Bond, along with other units and a new learning initiative for freshmen in STEM.

Walsh Family Hall of Architecture 
The School of Architecture is housed in the Walsh Family Hall of Architecture. Construction started on 31 October 2016 and was completed in January 2019, and the 110,000-square-foot building was designed by John Simpson, the structural engineering done by Thornton Tomasetti and built by the Walsh Group. It was named after a $33 million donation by Matthew Walsh. The architecture style is New Classicism and New Urbanism, of which John Simpson is a major figure having won the school's own Driehaus Architecture Prize, and is inspired by the classical elements taught in the École des Beaux-Arts. According to these principles, the building is spartan and durable in its construction materials to maximize functionality, durability, and economy, while having more elaborate and decorated styles in the main entrance, hall of casts, auditoriums and the library. It was built in the southern side of campus, in the new arts district, close to the O’Neill Hall, the DeBartolo Performing Arts Center, Charles B. Hayes Family Sculpture Park and the planned Raclin Murphy Museum of Art. The building is centered around a court and provides architecture studios in a two-story wing along the north; a library on the east; with an auditorium and exhibition galleries along the main circulation spine, which is in the form of a Greek stoa. The entrance to the is marked by an Ionic portico, while a tower at the center of the court is positioned to stand out in the views from the university's main entrance and to facilitate access to the external amphitheater.

The courtyard of the building features a 14 ft sculpture of Leon Battista Alberti, architect and key feature of the Italian Renaissance, by Scottish sculptor Alexander Stoddart, the artist's tallest single figure. Alberti's ideas of balance and harmony between the individual and the city are inspiration for the new urbanism philosophy taught at the school.

Other 
West Lake Hall, which opened in the fall of 2012, is located on the Western edge of campus and holds the School's woodshop. Classes for the Furniture Design and Architecture and the Building Arts Concentrations are held there.  The building contains a second shop and studio area for the Industrial Design section of the Department of Art, Art History, & Design at the University of Notre Dame.

The University also maintains a Global Gateway in Rome, Italy, with two locations in the historic city center. Included in the building is considerable room for the School's Rome Studies Program, as well as space for other study-abroad students, Notre Dame International, the Notre Dame Club of Italy, and various academic conferences. From 1986-2013, the School of Architecture had a building located on Via Monterone, which consisted of parts of two Roman palazzi.  Facilities include studio space for approximately 50-55 students, offices for faculty and staff, an auditorium/meeting room, a small library, a computer cluster, and a student kitchen and dining area.  Students live nearby in a hotel just off of Campo de' Fiori.  The year-long Rome program was founded in 1969 by the late Frank Montana and is now a requirement for all third-year architecture students.

The Richard H. Driehaus Prize at the University of Notre Dame
Since 2003, Richard H. Driehaus and the University of Notre Dame School of Architecture have together awarded the annual Richard H. Driehaus Prize at the University of Notre Dame for a lifetime of achievement in classical and traditional architecture and sustainable urbanism.  The Driehaus Prize has been presented to architects representing various classical traditions, whose artistic impact reflects their commitment to cultural and environmental conservation.  Past winners include Léon Krier, Allan Greenberg, Elizabeth Plater-Zyberk and Andres Duany, Abdel-Wahed El-Wakil, and Robert A.M. Stern.

Summer programs
The School often sponsors summer programs to introduce students to international traditional and classical architecture and urbanism. Previous programs have traveled to China, Japan, Cuba, Portugal, Greece, Italy, and the United Kingdom. The programs explore each country's best practices in urban development, sustainable architecture and environmental planning.

The China program, typically conducted every other year, look at Asia's architectural traditions and its influence on modern urban living. The program examines how architects and planners have responded to evolving social demands compared to their counterparts in the West. New construction is also studied to learn how the country reflects that heritage even as it evolves.

The School of Architecture also provides high school students with the opportunity to study architecture at Notre Dame for two weeks in the summer. The Career Discovery program is intended to help participants decide whether or not they want to pursue architecture in college, and if so, how they should prepare during their junior and senior years of high school.

Notable alumni
Gene Bertoncini
John Burgee
Francis D.K. Ching
Marianne Cusato
Eugenio Rayneri Piedra
Dan Rockhill

References

External links

 

School Of Architecture
1898 establishments in Indiana
Architecture schools in Indiana
Educational institutions established in 1898